Denise Amber Lee was a 21 year old woman who was murdered by Michael King in the U.S. state of Florida on January 17, 2008 after he had kidnapped and raped her earlier in the day.

Lee and several others had attempted to call for help through the 9-1-1 system but there was a lack of communication and the police and other emergency services arrived too late. Five 9-1-1 calls were made that day, including one by Lee herself from her abductor's phone and one from a witness, Jane Kowalski, who gave a detailed account of events as they unfolded before her. Failures were found in the way the 9-1-1 operators handled Kowalski's call, and additional failures were identified nationwide in the 9-1-1 system. King was sentenced to death.

The Denise Amber Lee Act was passed unanimously by the Florida Legislature on April 24, 2008. This act provides for optional training for 9-1-1 operators. Lee's family continue to lobby for a new law to be passed nationwide that would institute mandatory training and certification for all 9-1-1 dispatchers. The Denise Amber Lee Foundation was established in June 2008 to promote such training as well as to raise public awareness of the issues involved. Lee was the daughter of a police detective, Sgt Rick Goff.

Victim
Denise Amber Lee (née Goff) (August 6, 1986 – January 17, 2008) was born in Englewood, Florida. Lee was the daughter of Sgt. Rick Goff, of the sheriff's office in Charlotte County, Florida and Sue Goff. Not long after their first date, Lee's future husband, Nathan, bought her a $40 heart-shaped ring which she never removed. The ring later became key evidence connecting perpetrator and victim.

Perpetrator
Michael Lee King (born May 4, 1971) trained as a plumber but had been unemployed for several months before the crime and was facing foreclosure on his home in North Port, Florida. He was married but is now divorced. He has a low IQ, and family members described to the court how King had an accident while sledding as a child; an expert witness described the subsequent injury as a "divot" in his brain.

Crime
On January 17, 2008, Michael King abducted Denise Amber Lee from her home. He drove her around, tied up in his vehicle, for quite some time; several people witnessed the journey. Later, King raped and murdered Lee and buried her in a shallow grave. Her body was found on January 19, 2008. King was found guilty of kidnapping, sexual battery, and first-degree murder; he was sentenced to death and is presently detained awaiting execution.

Nathan Lee was at work that Thursday (January 17, 2008); his wife, Denise Lee, was home with their two young children. She called him at 11:21 a.m., the last time the two would speak. Among the topics discussed was the nice weather: the couple decided that the windows should be open at home. She said she had already opened them. Nathan Lee arrived home around 3:30 p.m. to find the windows closed, his wife missing, and the children home alone in the same crib. This prompted him to make his 9-1-1 call, the first of the day related to this crime.

A neighbor saw a car arrive at Lee's home around 2 p.m. The car was later identified as Michael King's dark green 1994 Chevrolet Camaro.

Lee was bound and taken to King's home in North Port, Florida, where he set up what the prosecution in the trial referred to as a "rape room." Duct tape and other evidence were found in this room.

She was taken to King's cousin Harold Muxlow's home, where King then borrowed a shovel, a gas can, and a flashlight. Lee was able to take King's cell phone while he was out of the vehicle and dial 9-1-1. Her desperate 9-1-1 call was released during the trial, which caused a lot of reaction from the public. The operator obtained information from Lee, which later helped convict King. The call is several minutes long, with Lee begging for her life, saying "please" 17 times. She answered the call taker's questions while pretending to talk to King. Judge Deno Economou, the presiding judge over the murder trial, noted how unusual and rare it was to hear a murder victim's last words. Prosecutors said later that Lee had given them their best evidence that she was taken against her will. She did not know her abductor, and her subsequent murder was premeditated. Lee was unable to give her exact location. Police were unable to trace the location of the caller (Denise Amber Lee) because it was made on a prepaid wireless phone.

Around 6:30 p.m., a witness, Jane Kowalski, heard screaming from a car next to hers at a stoplight. Kowalski called 9-1-1 to report what she believed to be child abduction.

At 9:15 p.m., roughly six hours after Lee was first reported missing, King was arrested.

Trial
The trial of the State of Florida vs. Michael L. King officially began on August 24, 2009. The lead prosecuting attorney was State Assistant Lon Arend. The lead defense attorney was Public Defender Carolyn Schlemmer. The presiding judge was Deno Economou, and the trial occurred in Sarasota County, Florida.

The prosecution presented DNA, and other forensic evidence, including hair and personal articles of Lee's found around and within the Camaro, King's home, and the grave site. Other evidence included King's change of clothing, duct tape, a shell casing, the shovel, and King's cell phone. The prosecution also called eyewitnesses, including Jane Kowalski and King's cousin. The defense attempted to provide reasonable doubt by bringing evidence of tampering and contamination to the jury and suggesting that one of King's friends had committed the crime. The judge disapproved of the latter defense. The defense rested without calling any witnesses.

On August 28, 2009, after deliberating for two hours and five minutes, the jury found King guilty of kidnapping with intent to commit a felony, sexual battery, and first-degree murder.  On September 4, 2009, at 2:45 pm, the jury handed down the recommended sentence of death in a 12–0 vote.

The 9-1-1 calls
In total, five 9-1-1 calls related to Lee's disappearance were placed by five people between 3:29 p.m. and 6:30 p.m. on January 17, 2008. Four were routed to operators in Sarasota County, Florida; the other—placed by Jane Kowalski and the fourth in the sequence—was routed to operators in neighboring Charlotte County, Florida. The call routed to Charlotte County allegedly was mishandled.

Lee placed the second call at 6:14 p.m. from her abductor's cell phone. The state prosecutors presented this call as part of the key evidence at King's trial.

Jane Kowalski's call was placed by cell phone at 6:30 p.m. while she was driving on U.S. Route 41. "I was at a stoplight, and a man pulled up next to me, and a child was screaming in the car," she said. She explained further that she heard "terrifying screaming" and "never heard anything like that." Kowalski believed that she was witnessing a child abduction. She also identified the car as a Camaro but stated the color as blue (rather than green). She stated that she had made eye contact with the driver, after which "a hand came up and started banging on the passenger window." Since she had crossed the county line into Charlotte, the call was routed to Charlotte County's 9-1-1 call center. It was only after she saw the news the following day that she realized she had witnessed the abduction of Lee rather than that of a child. When she called the North Port Police Department to explain who she was and that she had made a 9-1-1 call, it became apparent that the call had not been forwarded to the proper authorities. This call is alleged to have been mishandled because the operators neglected to file it correctly. The state prosecutors also presented this call as part of the key evidence at King's trial.

Legacy
As of July 2020, King is incarcerated in Union Correctional Institution in Raiford, Florida, awaiting imposition of the death sentence.

Due to Jane Kowalski's mishandled 9-1-1 call, more research revealed several issues countrywide in the 9-1-1 system, so a non-profit organization with the mission to "To promote and support public safety through uniform training, standardized protocols, defined measurable outcomes, and technological advances in the 9-1-1 system." was established in June 2008 in Lee's name.

On April 24, 2008, the Senate Bill, CS/SB 1694, concerning the Denise Amber Lee Act, which provides for voluntary training for 9-1-1 operators, was passed unanimously by the Florida Legislature. The act's passage into state law continues.

In 2010, House Bill CS/HB 355 and Senate Bill CS/SB 742 were to address the fact that 9-1-1 operators in the state are not required to undertake mandatory training. Lee's husband Nathan Lee and her father Rick Goff continued to lobby in Tallahassee to get Denise's Law passed, which recommended mandatory training and certification for all 9-1-1 dispatchers.

A separate bill, also in 2010 and sponsored by Representative Robert C. Schenck, would have placed significant limitations on 9-1-1 calls when played in public. The Lee family spoke against this bill. The governor of Florida, Charlie Crist, said that he was "not favorably inclined toward the bill".  The bill was later dropped.

See also 
 Carlie's Law
 Jessica's Law
 List of kidnappings

References

External links

Official websites and relevant blogs
  – The non-profit organization started by Lee's widower.
 

Further reading 
 Denise Lee slaying Topic page of Sarasota Herald-Tribune website, 2008
 Frantic calls for help fail to save Lee Breaking News, Sarasota Herald-Tribune; January 22, 2008; John Davis and Zac Anderson
 North Port Police never learned about key 911 call in Lee case Breaking News, Sarasota Herald-Tribune; February 8, 2008; John Davis
 The legacy of Denise Amber Lee Sarasota Herald-Tribune; January 18, 2009
 Prosecutor: Denise Amber Lee was tied to headboard in King's car Naples News; August 24, 2009; Elaine Allen-Emrich
 More training for North Port 911 center Sarasota Herald-Tribune; February 17, 2010
 Husband Pushes for Tougher 911 Dispatcher Training First Coast News; February 18, 2010; Len Kiese and Taren Reed

2008 in Florida
2008 murders in the United States
American murder victims
People murdered in Florida
Deaths by firearm in Florida
Deaths by person in Florida
Incidents of violence against women
Kidnappings in the United States
Rapes in the United States
Sarasota, Florida
Female murder victims
History of women in Florida